Julião da Kutonda (5 April 1965 – 19 April 2004) was an Angolan footballer who played as a defender. He made 35 appearances for the Angola national team from 1997 to 2001. He was also named in Angola's squad for the 1998 African Cup of Nations tournament.

References

External links
 

1965 births
2004 deaths
Angolan footballers
Footballers from Luanda
Association football defenders
Angola international footballers
1998 African Cup of Nations players
C.D. Primeiro de Agosto players